Mati Shemoelof (born July 11, 1972), is an Israeli author, poet, editor, journalist and activist. His first short story collection, "Remnants of the Cursed Book", won the 2015 award for Best Book of the Year of "Yekum Tarbut" website. "Bagdad - Haifa - Berlin" - His first Bi-Lingual collection of poems was published in Germany by Aphorisma Verlag.

Early life 
Shemoelof was born and raised in Haifa, Israel. He now lives in Berlin.

Shemoelof received his BA degree from the Department of Theater at Tel Aviv University, and an MA degree in History from the University of Haifa. His MA thesis was titled, "The cultural and mythical meanings of the appearance of the character of Malcolm X in Spike Lee movie (1992)".  For this work, he received the Dean’s Prize of Excellence. He was pursuing a PhD in Literature at the Hebrew University in Jerusalem, and left in order to focus on his writing.

He taught at Kedma High School in Jerusalem.

Publications
 Scar Minimizer, Gwanim publishers, 2001 (A poetry book).
 What is born from the fallen ceremony, 2002 (A theater play).
 Poetry between hazaz and shemoelof, Yaron Golan publishers, 2016 (poetry book).
 Why don't i write Israeli love poems, Nahar Books, 2010 (Poetry book).
 An Appetite for hunger, Nahar books, 2013 (poetry book).
 Remnants of the cursed book and other short stories, Zmora Bitan publishers, 2014 (A collection of short stories).
 Last tango in Berlin, boxilla publishers, 2014 (A poetry book).
 Hebrew outside its sweet inside, Pardes publishing, 2017 (A poetry book).
 ...reißt die Mauern ein zwischen 'uns' und 'ihnen', AphorismA Verlag, 2018 (Kleine Texte 84).
 Die künftige Ufer, WDR Radio, 2018 (Hörspiel).
 Bagdad Haifa Berlin, AphorismA Verlag, 2019 (A bi lingual collection of poems)
 "An Eruption from the East: Re visiting the emergence of the Mizrahi artistic explosion and it’s imprint on the Israeli cultural narrative", Iton 77 publishers, 2019 (An articles book).
 Bleiben oder Wiederstehen, AphorismA Verlag, 2020 (Kleine Texte 92).
 The prize, Pardes publishing house, 2021 (A novel). The book was included in the final list of books nominated for the Shulamit Aloni Prize

Awards and honors
 2022, The novel "The Prize" was on the final list of books nominated for the Shulamit Aloni's literary prize.
 2022, Stipendienprogramm 2022 im Raumen von Neustart Kultur und VG Wort. 
 2021, The Berlin Senat Grant for the “Middle East Union”’s festival.
 2020 “An Eruption from the East: Re visiting the emergence of the mizrahi artistic explosion and it’s imprint on the Israeli cultural narrative” First collection of articles was published in Israel 
 2019 First collection of poems was published in Germany
 2018 First Hörspil - WDR
 2017 LCB berlin sommerfest
 2016 Helicon International Literary festival
 2016 Basel International Literary Festival
 2015 - Best book of year prize on "Yekum Tarbut"
 2014 - Arab Jewish Texts—Conference, Chicago University
 2014 - "Digital Roundtable" conference at Cornell University
 2014 - Rabinovich Foundation Prize           
 2014 - Contemporary Israeli Poetry from Berlin
 2013 - ACUM – Grant
 2012 - A Translation workshop - Literaturwerkstatt Berlin
 2011 - Honorable mention at "Haaretz" Annual short story contest  
 2011 - Honorable mention at "Einat" Annual Science fiction short story contest  
 2006 - Best Poetry Book of the Year (Haifa Cultural Foundation)
 2010 - Rabinovich Foundation Prize  
 2001 - "Best Debut Poetry Book of the Year" (National Art Trust of the National Lottery)

Literary work 

Shemoelof writing is diverse and includes poetry, drama and prose. His works have won significant recognition and prizes.

Shemoelof has published seven poetry books: "The Scar Minimizer" (2001); "Poetry Between Hazaz and Shemoelof" (2006); "Why Don’t I write Israeli Love Songs" (2010); "Appetite for Hunger" (2013), "Last tango in Berlin" (2014). "Hebrew from its inner outsiders" (2017).

His first short stories book was published by Kinneret Zmora-Bitan Dvir, the leading publishing company in Israel.

His works have been translated to six languages, and gained worldwide attention. A German translation of some of Shemoelof's literary pieces was done by Berlin's Literaturwerkstatt, which also invited him to Berlin to record him reading his poems on audio. English translations of his works were published in major journals, such as Zeek, Fusion, and Arspolitica. An Arabic translation of his works was recently published in several leading literary papers, including ones in Egypt and in Lebanon. Besides that, his works have been translated to Japanese and Italian.

Shemoelof was awarded several notable prizes for his works. Some notable ones are the prize for "Best Debut Poetry Book of the Year", awarded by the National Art Trust of the National Lottery, in 2001; the prize for "Best Poetry Book of the Year", awarded by the Haifa Cultural Foundation, in 2006; an Honorable Mention, awarded by the Israeli Haaretz magazine during its annual short story contest, in 2011; Best poetry book of the year (Haifa Cultural Foundation 2006); and the highly appreciated Acum Prize for advocating literature in Israel, in 2013. Additionally, his play "What Has the Memorial Day Service Become" appeared in the Small-Bama festival at the University of Tel Aviv.

In addition, he co-edited several poetry anthologies: "Aduma" (Red: An Anthology of Class Poetry), which had been sold in three editions since its first release in 2007; "Tehudot Zehut" (Echoing Identities) (2007), an anthology addressing the issues of third generation Mizrahi Jews in Israel, in which Shemoelof's shory autobiographical story "The Icebergs of the Memory" was published; "La-Tzet!" (To Get Out!), is a 2009 collection of visual art pieces and poems against the war in Gaza. "La-Tzet!" represents the ideological unification of the artistic and literary society in Israel, in revolt towards the complex political situation, and it was translated and published in both English and Arabic; "Al Tagidu BaGat", which was published in 2010 and explored the influence of the 1948 Palestinian exodus on the Hebrew Poetry. 
Shemoelof was also the editor of the Israeli literary journal HaKivun Mizrah (Eastward) between 2006 and 2008.

He also was publishes regularly in Israel's leading media channels. He wrote a weekly column in the daily Israel HaYom (Israel Today), where he also posted literature reviews, and at Mako, the Internet news site of Keshet. Previously, he was a columnist at an Israeli news website, Ynet, (Israel's most popular news site), NRG -(Israel's #3 news site) at Ma’ariv., and at Walla!, Israel's most popular portal. He also appeared on TV, including as a panel member on Popolitika (public channel TV);  The Owls (culture channel TV); Channel 10 News, and others.

In 2017 he published the first chapter from his coming novel "The German Hebrew Dialogue: Studies of encounter and exchange" edited by Amir Eshel and Rachel Seelig. De Gruyter publishers. Also he published an article about Mizrahim in Berlin on Jalta magazine, volume 2.
On 2018 His first booklet was published in Germany: "...reißt die Mauern die zwischen 'uns' und 'inhen'", AphorismA Verlag, 2018.
 In 2018, he also wrote his first radio sketch for WDR channel.
Shemoelof claims that he belongs not only to the Israeli Jewish culture but also to the German culture and he writes: "For an Israeli entering a trilingual space (Hebrew, English, German), culture is no longer bounded by national borders."

In 2020 he published a long article about his belonging to the German culture. He asked: "Who owns German culture in this day and age? Can a Jewish or Israeli poet, writing in broken Hebrew, broken English, and broken German and living in a German-speaking region be considered a German, or a European, poet? Can Leah Goldberg's and Amir Eshel's works be incorporated into the local (German) curriculum as native works?".

In an interview to the German newspaper, Tagesspiegel (2021), he thanked the city of Berlin that gave him a freedom to write.

Activism 

Shemoelof is a political and social activist, and his writing depicts subjects which he promotes.

The political nature of Shemoelof's literary work is closely tied to his activist endeavors. One representation of that is his contribution, as a co-editor, to the "Ruh Jedida - A New Spirit" project, an open letter from Israeli descendants of the Arab Jews of the Middle East and North Africa, to their Muslim peers living in those very countries. The letter embodies the idea of promoting change through ״intra-regional and inter-religious dialog.״.

Additionally, Shemoelof is a co-founder of "Culture Guerrilla", an Israeli movement which propagates poetry as an accessible art form, and promotes political causes by means of art performed in public. Despite the usually exclusive nature of poetry and poetry reading, the movement has achieved significant success in high-profile cases regarding contemporary economical and social events, reaching front headlines in Israel, along with several journalistic mentions abroad, the most notable of which was a New York Times article. In 2013, the "Culture Guerrilla" publishers, under Shemoelof's supervision, edited two editions of the new Mizrahi poetry collective named "Ars Poetics" that became one of the leading stages of the Mizrahi art scene in Israel.
Shemoelof is also the co-founder of the Israeli Poets Union.

Shemoelof has engaged in extensive volunteer work. He was a founding member of the Haifa branch of the political info-shop, Salon Mazal. He volunteered in Keshet, The Democratic Rainbow Organization, as a researcher and spokesman for five years. He co-founded the multi-ethnical annual workshops in Tel Aviv for Ashkenazi and Mizrahi cultural movements at
Beit Leyvik House for Yiddish writers. He contributed critical texts to several plastic art shows at the Tel Aviv Museum of Art and at Bezalel Academy of Arts.

Between 2006 and 2008, Shemoelof was part of MiMizrach Shemesh, an organization devoted to the Jewish tradition of social responsibility.

Shemoleof temporarily relocated to Berlin in September 2013. He considers it to be a political act, in order to rewrite the context of the Jewish national and creative revival. He sees the Israeli literary diaspora in Berlin as an endeavor to create an alternate narrative for the history of modern Jewish literature, which is usually exclusively entwined with the birthing of the state of Israel. He is one of founders of the Poetic Hafla, a multi-language Poetry-Art-Music parties in Berlin. On 2018 Shemoelof with Hila Amit created a new Jewish-Arabic literature  "Anu: Jews and Arabs writing in Berlin".

Bibliography

References

External links
 Portfolio
 Articles at Plus61j, 2018–2019.
 How to explain hare hunting to a dead German Artist. Tohu Magazine, 2019.
 Performing identity: A city to lose and find oneself: Interview with Noa Amiel, Politic Orange, 2018–2019.
 Die andere Araben, Miriam Dagan, Jungle World, January 26, 2019
 Schalom, Alte Welt Stadt,  Inge Guenther, Frankfurter Rundschau, October 19, 2018
 Mati Shemoelof on the new literature lexis icon
 Miri Regev Cultural war, The New York Times, 2016 
 "Between family and postcolonial Earth", By Yitzhak Laor, Haaretz, August 24, 2007.
 History & Theory, Issue No. 4 – The Ides of April, Eli Petel: Re-identity, Social Process and Inter-generational Vista.
 My society, my self, Tahel Frosh, Haaretz'', 29.03.2008.
 As a New Black Panther Party Forms, Poetry and Music Bring Mizrahi Jews Together in Celebration 31, Mati Shemoelof
  Guerrilla Culture, The Poetic Science of Resistance, 8/12/2008
 Shemoelof songs in Arabic
 poets, artists, activists visit embattled Beduin Village, Ben Hartman, Jerusalem Post, 22.8.2010
 Mati Shemoelof on Lyrikline.org, 2013.

1972 births
Living people
Israeli poets
Israeli bloggers
Israeli Mizrahi Jews
Israeli journalists